The 1934 Memorial Cup final was the 16th junior ice hockey championship of the Canadian Amateur Hockey Association. The George Richardson Memorial Trophy champions Toronto St. Michael's Majors of the Ontario Hockey Association in Eastern Canada competed against the Abbott Cup champions Edmonton Athletics of the Edmonton Junior Hockey League in Western Canada. In a best-of-three series, held at Shea's Amphitheatre in Winnipeg, Manitoba, St. Michael's won their 1st Memorial Cup, defeating Edmonton 2 games to 0.

Scores
Game 1: St. Michael's 5-0 Edmonton
Game 2: St. Michael's 6-4 Edmonton

Winning roster
John Acheson, Bobby Bauer, Frank Bauer, J.J. Burke, Mickey Drouillard, John Hamilton, Reg Hamilton, Art Jackson, Pep Kelly, Nick Metz, Leo McLean, Harvey Teno, Don Willson.  Coach: Dr. W.J. LaFlamme

References

External links
 Memorial Cup
 Canadian Hockey League

1933–34 in Canadian ice hockey
Memorial Cup tournaments
Ice hockey in Winnipeg